Lars Christian Termansen (formerly Nielsen) (born 17 June 1979) is a Danish professional football defender, who currently plays at Kolding FC.

External links
Career statistics at Danmarks Radio

1979 births
Living people
Danish men's footballers
Esbjerg fB players
AC Horsens players
Danish Superliga players

Association football defenders